Troston is a village and civil parish in the English county of Suffolk.

It is around five miles north-north-east of Bury St Edmunds. Its parish church contains rare mediaeval wall paintings, including dragon-slaying and the Martyrdom of St Edmund. It had one public house called The Bull. 
The village shop, formerly a Wesleyan chapel, has been closed for some time, and is now a private residence.
The centre of the village, surrounded by farms, is characterised by housing estates built through the 1950s to 1970s, with minor, more localised, expansion since.
Local children attend primary school in nearby Honington.

The local pub, The Bull, had been a central part of the village since the late 1800s, but has now closed, leaving it boarded up. Owners, brewers Greene King, intend to sell it as a pub, and have controversially dug up the local playing and football field, and are now in the process of developing a new housing estate.

The Bull has now reopened as a Free House with a restaurant.

The former Village Shop, the other historic hub of the village and former Wesleyan Chapel, is now a private residence.

Troston Hall, to the south of the village is a Grade II* listed late sixteenth-century manor house, accompanied by the Grade II listed Hall Farm to its immediate north.

There are 16 listed buildings in the village.

Governance & religion
The parish falls within the West Suffolk District Council ward of Pakenham & Troston, the Suffolk County Council electoral division of Thingoe North, and the parliamentary constituency of Bury St Edmunds, whose MP since 2015 is Jo Churchill of the Conservative Party.

The Church of England parish falls within the province of Canterbury, the diocese of St Edmundsbury and Ipswich, the archdeaconry of Sudbury, and the deanery of Ixworth; the Roman Catholic parish falls within the province of Westminster, the diocese of East Anglia, and the deanery of Bury St Edmunds.

Notable residents
Edward Capell (1713-1781), Shakespearian critic and Groom of the Privy Chamber
Capel Lofft (1754-1824), lawyer, political figure, and writer.

References

External links 

Details of the church
St Edmund Martyrdom Wall Painting

Villages in Suffolk
Civil parishes in Suffolk
Borough of St Edmundsbury